The 1928 Schaumburg-Lippe state election was held on 29 April 1928 to elect the 15 members of the Landtag of the Free State of Schaumburg-Lippe.

Results

References 

Schaumburg-Lippe
Elections in Lower Saxony